Stenaelurillus pecten is  a species of jumping spider in the genus Stenaelurillus that lives in Botswana and Zambia. It was first described in 2014 by Wanda Wesołowska. The carapace has a line of brushes around it, formed of white hair. It is distinguished from other members of the genus by the comb-like appendage on the male's palpal bulb, after which the spider gets its name. The female has a distinctive arrangement of the copulatory openings in the epigyne.

Taxonomy
Stenaelurillus pecten was first described by Wanda Wesołowska in 2014. It is one of over 500 species identified by the Polish arachnologist. The genus Stenaelurillus was first raised by Eugène Simon in 1885. The name relates to the genus name Aelurillus, which itself derives from the Greek word for cat, with the addition of a Greek stem meaning narrow. In 2017, it was grouped with nine other genera of jumping spiders under the name Aelurillines. It has been placed in the subtribe Aelurillina in the tribe Aelurillini in the clade Saltafresia. The species name is the Latin word for comb and recalls the shape of the appendages on the male palpal bulb.

Description
The spider is small. It has a dark brown oval carapace that is covered in dense brown hairs. Two stripes of white hairs line the edge which looks like brushes and another two cross the thorax. The eye field is black, spinnerets brown and legs yellow. The pedipalps are also yellow, covered in dense black hairs. It can be distinguished from other members of the genus by its comb like appendages on the embolus, which is thin and delicate.

The female is very similar to the male. The abdomen has two white spots towards the back of the spider. As in the similar Stenaelurillus abramovi and Stenaelurillus lesserti, the copulatory openings in the epigyne are close together. However, it is distinguishable from other species by the way that the copulatory openings are closely aligned with each other.

Distribution
The distribution includes both Botswana and Zambia. The holotype was identified near Lusaka, Zambia, based on a specimen collected in 1979. It has also been found near Mumbwa and in the Moremi Game Reserve in Botswana.

References

Citations

Bibliography

Arthropods of Botswana
Invertebrates of Zambia
Salticidae
Spiders described in 2014
Spiders of Africa
Taxa named by Wanda Wesołowska